In linguistics, definiteness is a semantic feature of noun phrases, distinguishing between referents or senses that are identifiable in a given context (definite noun phrases) and those which are not (indefinite noun phrases). The prototypical definite noun phrase picks out a unique, familiar, specific referent such as the sun or Australia, as opposed to indefinite examples like an idea or some fish.

There is considerable variation in the expression of definiteness across languages, and some languages such as Japanese do not generally mark it so that the same expression could be definite in some contexts and indefinite in others. In other languages, such as English, it is usually marked by the selection of determiner (e.g., the vs a). In still other languages, such as Danish, definiteness is marked morphologically.

Definiteness as a grammatical category 
There are times when a grammatically marked definite NP is not in fact identifiable. For example, the polar bear's habitat is the arctic does not refer to a unique, familiar, specific bear, in an example of a form-meaning mismatch. "The theoretical distinction between grammatical definiteness and cognitive identifiability has the advantage of enabling us to distinguish between a discrete (grammatical) and a non-discrete (cognitive) category."[p. 84]

Use in different languages

English 
In English, definiteness is usually marked by the selection of determiner. Certain determiners, such as a, an, many, and some, along with numbers (e.g., four items), typically mark a noun phrase as indefinite. Others, including the, that, and genitive noun phrases (e.g., my brother) typically mark the noun phrase as definite.

A number of tests have been proposed to distinguish definite from indefinite noun phrases. "Each has a foundation in intuition, as well as some degree of grammatical effect. However, it is not clear that any of them corresponds cleanly to formal categories."
If a noun phrase can be put into an existential clause such as there is noun phrase at the door (e.g., there are two wolves at the door), it is likely indefinite.
"The concept of identifiability expressed by the definite article is best understood in terms of pre-empting a question with which?"

Other languages 
 In Basque, definiteness is marked by a phrasal clitic article.  ("woman"),  (woman-ART: "the woman"),  (woman beautiful-ART: "the beautiful woman")
 In Danish, definiteness is marked morphologically.
 In Albanian definiteness is marked by a noun affix.  ("boy");  (djal-ART: "the boy");  (djal-ART i madh: "the elder son");  ("girl");  (vajz-ART: "the girl");  (vajz-ART e bukur: "the pretty girl")
 in Hungarian, verbs show agreement with the definiteness of their object:  (read-1sg.pres.INDEF a book-ACC.sg: "I read a book") versus  (read-1sg.pres.DEF the book-ACC.sg: "I read the book")
Japanese,  ( "I have a/the book"), is ambiguous between definite and indefinite readings.

Germanic, Romance, Celtic, Semitic, and auxiliary languages generally have a definite article, often preposed but in some cases postposed. Many other languages do not. Some examples are Chinese, Japanese, Finnish, and modern Slavic languages except Bulgarian and Macedonian. When necessary, languages of this kind may indicate definiteness by other means such as demonstratives.

It is common for definiteness to interact with the marking of case in certain syntactic contexts. In many languages, a direct object receives distinctive marking only if it is definite. For example, in Turkish, the direct object in the sentence  (meaning "I saw the man") is marked with the suffix  (indicating definiteness). The absence of the suffix on a direct object in Turkish means that it is indefinite and, in the absence of the indefinite article , no longer explicitly singular:  ("I saw a man/I saw men").

In Serbo-Croatian, in the Baltic languages Latvian and Lithuanian, and, to a lesser extent in Slovene, definiteness can be expressed morphologically on prenominal adjectives. The short form of the adjective is interpreted as indefinite, while the long form is definite or specific:

 short (indefinite): Serbo-Croatian  "a new city"; Lithuanian  "a white book" ; Latvian  "a white house"
 long (definite):  "the new city, a certain new city";  "the white book, a certain white book" ;   "the white house"

In some languages, the definiteness of the object affects the transitivity of the verb. In the absence of peculiar specificity marking, it also tends to affect the telicity of mono-occasional predications.

In some Scandinavian languages, such as Swedish, definite nouns inflect with a dedicated set of suffixes. This is known in Swedish as the grammatical category of Species.

See also 
 Construct state
 Article (grammar)
 Topic–comment
 Specificity

References

Notes

Further reading 

 Aguilar-Guevara A, Pozas Loyo J, Vázquez-Rojas Maldonado V (eds.). 2019. Definiteness across languages. Berlin: Language Science Press. . . Open Access. http://langsci-press.org/catalog/book/227.
Hawkins, J.A. (1978) Definiteness and indefiniteness: a study in reference and grammaticality prediction. London:Croom Helm.
 Definite article from Glottopedia

External links
http://www.smg.surrey.ac.uk/features/morphosyntactic/definiteness/ doi 10.15126/SMG.18/1.06

Grammatical categories
Semantics
Formal semantics (natural language)